The following lists events that happened during 1970 in South Africa.

Incumbents
 State President: Jim Fouché.
 Prime Minister: John Vorster.
 Chief Justice: Lucas Cornelius Steyn.

Events

May
 21 – Prime Minister John Vorster and Prime Minister of Rhodesia Ian Smith hold private talks.

June
 12 – Mangosuthu Buthelezi is elected first Chief Executive Officer of the black homeland of KwaZulu.

December
 7 – The U.N. General Assembly supports the isolation of South Africa for its apartheid policies.

Births
 4 January – Marc Batchelor, soccer player (d. 2019)
 7 January – Sizwe Motaung, soccer player (d. 2001)
 30 January – Hans Vonk (footballer), soccer goalkeeper
 30 March – Ruben Kruger, rugby player (d. 2010)
 19 February – Kurt Darren, singer
 2 March – Nicolene Neal, lawn bowler
 30 March – Leleti Khumalo, actress
 12 May – Steve Palframan, cricketer
 22 May – Pollen Ndlanya soccer player
 3 June – Johan Ackermann, rugby player & coach
 10 June – Connie Ferguson, Botswana-born South African actress
 20 June – Athol Williams (AE Ballakisten), poet and social philosopher
 3 July – Deon Kayser, rugby player
 30 July – Eric Tinkler, soccer player
 8 August – Chester Williams, rugby player (d. 2019)
 10 September – Phaswane Mpe, poet and novelist (d. 2004)
 28 September – Vatiswa Ndara, actress
 27 October – Tina Jaxa, actress
 14 November – André Venter, rugby player
 5 December – Sibusiso Vilane, adventurer, motivational speaker & author, first black African to summit Mount Everest

Deaths

Railways

Locomotives
 The South African Railways places the first of eighty Class 6E mainline electric locomotives in service. Two are also built for Iscor for use at the Sishen iron ore mine.

Sports

Rugby
 10 January – The South African Springboks draw 8–8 with Ireland at Lansdowne Road, Dublin, Ireland.

References

South Africa
Years in South Africa
History of South Africa